The 2005 Fortis Championships Luxembourg was a women's tennis tournament played on indoor hard courts in Kockelscheuer, Luxembourg which was part of Tier II of the 2005 WTA Tour. It was the 10th edition of the tournament and was held from 26 September until 2 October 2005. First-seeded Kim Clijsters won the singles title, her fifth in total at the event, and earned $93,000 first-prize money.

Finals

Singles

 Kim Clijsters defeated  Anna-Lena Grönefeld, 6–2, 6–4
 This was Clijsters' 8th singles title of the year and the 29th of her career.

Doubles

 Lisa Raymond /  Samantha Stosur defeated   Cara Black /  Rennae Stubbs, 7–5, 6–1

References

External links
 ITF tournament edition details
 Tournament draws

SEAT Luxembourg Open
Luxembourg Open
2005 in Luxembourgian tennis